Osleston and Thurvaston is a civil parish in the South Derbyshire district of Derbyshire, England.  The parish contains six listed buildings that are recorded in the National Heritage List for England.  All the listed buildings are designated at Grade II, the lowest of the three grades, which is applied to "buildings of national importance and special interest".  The parish contains the villages of Osleston and Thurvaston and is otherwise rural.  The listed buildings consist of three farmhouses, a house with an attached outbuilding, a well house, and a chapel.


Buildings

References

Citations

Sources

 

Lists of listed buildings in Derbyshire